Baigneaux is the name of several communes in France:

 Baigneaux, Eure-et-Loir, in the Eure-et-Loir department
 Baigneaux, Gironde in the Gironde department
 Baigneaux, Loir-et-Cher in the Loir-et-Cher department